Vallegrande Municipality is the first municipal section of the Vallegrande Province in the Santa Cruz Department, Bolivia. Its capital is Vallegrande.

Administrative divisions 
The municipality of Vallegrande is divided into sixteen cantons. 
 Alto Seco (cantón)
 Chaco (cantón)
 El Bello (cantón)
 Guadalupe (cantón)
 Khasa Monte (cantón)
 Loma Larga (cantón)
 Mankaillpa (cantón)
 Masicurí (cantón)
 Naranjos (cantón)
 Piraymiri (cantón)
 San Juan del Tucumansillo (cantón)
 Santa Ana (cantón)
 Santa Rosita (cantón)
 Sitanos (cantón)
 Temporal (cantón)
 Vallegrande (cantón)

Languages 

The predominant language in the Vallegrande Municipality is Spanish.

References 
 obd.descentralizacion.gov.bo
 www.ine.gov.bo / census 2001: Vallegrande Province

External links 
 
 

Municipalities of Santa Cruz Department (Bolivia)